Regine Yau Wai-ching (born 6 May 1991) is a Hong Kong former politician and former member of the localist group Youngspiration. She was elected to the Legislative Council of Hong Kong as a member for Kowloon West in the 2016 Legislative Council election, but has since been disqualified pursuant to a judgment delivered by the High Court on 15 November 2016. As the youngest female parliament member in the Hong Kong history being elected on the age of 25, she is acclaimed to be a "daughter of Hong Kong" by the Chinese historian and political commentator Zhongjing Liu for her pro-democracy statesmanship and the advocacy for the self-determination of the Hong Kong national identity.

Background
Yau was born on 6 May 1991 at St Teresa's Hospital in Kowloon City, Hong Kong to a middle-class family. Both her parents were civil servants. Her father was a technical officer in the Hong Kong government. She was educated at Queen Elizabeth School and studied Chinese language at Lingnan University. She was an intern at Ta Kung Pao newspaper during her studies.

She is a former member of Youngspiration, a localist group formed by young people after the Umbrella Revolution. Youngspiration fielded nine candidates in the 2015 District Council elections, in which Yau ran against legislator Priscilla Leung in Whampoa East. As a newcomer, Yau received 2,041 votes, only about 300 votes less than Leung. After the district council election, Yau served as District Councillor Kwong Po-yin's assistant and Youngspiration's Whampoa community officer.

Legislative Councillor and disqualification

Representing Youngspiration in the 2016 Legislative Council election, she won the sixth and final seat in the Kowloon West geographical constituency. With 20,643 votes, Yau edged out incumbent Wong Yuk-man to become the youngest female member of the Legislative Council. She was the second youngest member behind localist Nathan Law, who also won within the same election on Hong Kong Island.

On 12 October 2016, Yau and her party colleague Baggio Leung attended the swearing-in ceremony at the first Legislative Council session. The two of them inserted their own words into the official script and had their oaths rejected. They were criticised for pronouncing China as "Jee-na", a term considered derogatory since the Second Sino-Japanese War, and Yau mispronounced "People's Republic of China" as "people's re-fucking of Jee-na". As a result, their qualification as legislators were challenged by the government in court. The National People's Congress Standing Committee (NPCSC) intervened in the court case by interpreting Article 104 of the Basic Law of Hong Kong to "clarify" the provision of the legislators to swear allegiance to Hong Kong as part of China when they take office. The NPCSC insisted the oath taking must be conducted sincerely and accurately, and later stated that China would firmly oppose Hong Kong independence.

On 15 November, the court disqualified the two legislators on the grounds they did not take their oaths "faithfully and truthfully". On 26 August 2017, the Court of Final Appeal of Hong Kong refused to appeal the case, holding that they did not have a reasonably arguable case. Leung and Yau were found to have manifestly refused and wilfully omitted to take their oath – an act classed as declining and neglecting it. On 28 June 2019, Yau withdrew from the Youngspiration party.

In May 2020, the Legislative Council Commission demanded Yau to repay H.K. $930,000 (U.S. $120,000) from public funds, claiming that she was mistakenly paid the salary and funds granted to legislators. The court ruling, which came right before her 29th birthday, prompted Yau to remark, "I would rebuild no matter how hard the impact."

Personal life
As of 2022, Yau is married to Matthew Lam, former spokesman of the Spark Alliance. She is also no longer involved in Hong Kong politics.

Notes

References

1991 births
Living people
Alumni of Lingnan University (Hong Kong)
Youngspiration politicians
HK LegCo Members 2016–2021
Kowloon City
Hong Kong independence movement
Hong Kong pan-democrats
People from Kowloon
21st-century women politicians
People expelled from public office
Hong Kong political prisoners
21st-century Hong Kong women politicians